Christian Bernardo (born 25 July 1998) is a Filipino badminton player.

Career 
In his junior career, he partnered with Alvin Morada and entered the finals of the 2015 Victor Australian Junior International. They also won the boys' doubles title at the Singapore Youth International Series in 2015. He also played mixed doubles with Eleanor Inlayo and were runners-up at the Victor Australian Junior International.

In 2022, under the coach of Rosman Razak, Bernardo returned to badminton and reestablished his partnership with Morada. Bernardo and Morada went onto win the 2022 Cameroon and also Benin International. They also finished as runners-up at the Vietnam International Series and the Bangladesh International. The duo also broke into the top 100 of the BWF World Ranking on the end of the 2022 BWF season.

Achievements

BWF International Challenge/Series (3 titles, 3 runners-up) 
Men's doubles

Mixed doubles

  BWF International Challenge tournament
  BWF International Series tournament
  BWF Future Series tournament

BWF Junior International (1 title, 2 runners-up) 
Boys' doubles

Mixed doubles

  BWF Junior International Grand Prix tournament
  BWF Junior International Challenge tournament
  BWF Junior International Series tournament
  BWF Junior Future Series tournament

External links

References 

1998 births
Living people
Filipino male badminton players